Ikshvaku (Sanskrit ;) is a legendary king in Hindu mythology. He is described to be the first king of the Kosala kingdom, and was one of the ten sons of Shraddhadeva Manu, the first man on the earth. He was the founder and first king of the Ikshvaku dynasty, also known as the Suryavamsha, in the kingdom of Kosala, which also historically existed in ancient India. He had a hundred sons, among whom the eldest was Vikukshi. Another son of Ikshvaku's, named Nimi, founded the Kingdom of the Videhas. Rama and the Buddha are also stated to have belonged to the Suryavamsha or Ikshvaku dynasty.  He is mentioned in the Vishnu Purana.

In Jain texts, it is mentioned that Rishabhadeva is the same as King Ikshvaku (son of Nabhiraja). Except for Munisuvrata and Neminatha, the remaining Jain Tirthankaras are believed to have been royals of the Ikshvaku lineage.

Origin
From Kashyapa, through Aditi, Vivasvan was generated, and from him came Shraddhadeva Manu, who was born from the womb of Sanjna. Shraddhadeva's wife, Shraddha, gave birth to 10 sons, including Ikshvaku and Nriga. 

The Atharvaveda and Brahmanas associate the Ikshvakus with non-Aryan people, distinct from the Aryans who composed the hymns of the four Vedas. F. E. Pargiter has equated the Ikshvakus with the Dravidians. According to Franciscus Kupier, Manfred Mayrhofer and Levman, the Iskvaku is derived from a Munda name.

However, there are those who contend with Pargiter. Ghurye holds that the Ikshvakus were Aryan horsemen and must have arrived in the subcontinent before the Aryans who composed the Rigveda. The Brahmana texts do also state that the Ikshvakus were a line of princes descended from the Purus. The Rigveda mentions that the Purus are one of the Aryan tribes. Mandhatri, an Ikshvaku ruler, is described in the Rigveda to have annihilated the Dasyus, and seeks the help of the Ashvin twins, the divine physicians of the Vedic religion.

Literature 
Agastya explains the origin of Ikshvaku to Rama in the Ramayana:
The Vishnu Purana states that Ikshvaku emerged from the nostril of Manu when he happened to sneeze. He had a hundred sons, of whom the three most distinguished were Vikukshi, Nimi, and Danda. Fifty of his sons were the kings of the northern nations, while forty-eight of them were princes of the south. During an occasion known as Ashtaka, Ikshvaku wished to perform an ancestral rite, and ordered Vikukshi to bring him flesh suitable for the offering. The prince shot many deer in the forest, and other game, for the rite. Growing exhausted, he ate a hare among his catch and carried the other beasts to his father. Vashistha, the family priest of the dynasty of Ikshvaku, was requested to consecrate the offering. He declared that it was impure, since Vikukshi had eaten a hare among it, making his meal a residue. Vikukshi was abandoned by his father, offended by this act. But after the demise of Ikshvaku, the rule of Bhuloka passed on to Vikukshi, who was succeeded by his son, Puranjaya.

See also
Ikshvaku dynasty
Suryavamsha
Kshatriya
Dilīpa
Raghu
Dasharatha

Rama
Kusha

Notes

References

Citations

Sources

External links
Vishnu Purana Book 4 ch. 1 and 2, P-348 to 377
THE VALMIKI RAMAYANA – IIT Madras

Characters in Hindu mythology
Solar dynasty